Richard Alan Wentworth is a mathematician based in University of Maryland.

Wentworth received his Ph.D. from Columbia University in 1990 and his BS from the University of Wisconsin in 1985.

In 2012, Wentworth became a fellow of the American Mathematical Society.

References

Fellows of the American Mathematical Society
Year of birth missing (living people)
Living people
20th-century American mathematicians
University of Maryland, College Park faculty
Columbia University alumni
University of Wisconsin–Madison alumni
21st-century American mathematicians